The Outline of History, subtitled either "The Whole Story of Man" or "Being a Plain History of Life and Mankind", is a work by H. G. Wells chronicling the history of the world from the origin of the Earth to the First World War. It appeared in an illustrated version of 24 fortnightly installments beginning on 22 November 1919 and was published as a single volume in 1920. It sold more than two million copies, was translated into many languages, and had a considerable impact on the teaching of history in institutions of higher education. Wells modeled the Outline on the Encyclopédie of Denis Diderot.

Revised editions 
Many revised versions were published during Wells's lifetime, and the author kept notes on factual corrections which he received from around the world. The last revision which was published during his lifetime was published in 1937.

In 1949, an expanded version was produced by Raymond Postgate, who extended the narrative so it could include the Second World War, and later, he published another version which extended the narrative up to 1969. Postgate wrote that "readers wish to hear the views of Wells, not those of Postgate," and he endeavoured to preserve Wells's voice throughout the narrative. In later editions G. P. Wells, the author's son, updated the early chapters about prehistory in order to make them reflect current theories: previous editions had, for instance, given credence to Piltdown Man before it was exposed as a hoax. The final edition appeared in 1971, but earlier editions are still in print.

Organization of the work 
The third revised and rearranged edition is organised in chapters whose subjects are as follows:

Overarching themes

History as a quest for a common purpose 
From Neolithic times (12,000–10,000 years ago, by Wells's estimation) "[t]he history of mankind . . . is a history of more or less blind endeavours to conceive a common purpose in relation to which all men may live happily, and to create and develop a common stock of knowledge which may serve and illuminate that purpose."

Recurrent conquest of civilisation by nomads 
Wells was uncertain whether to place "the beginnings of settled communities living in towns" in Mesopotamia or Egypt. He was equally unsure whether to consider the development of civilisation as something that arose from "the widely diffused Heliolithic Neolithic culture" or something that arose separately. Between the nomadic cultures that originated in the Neolithic Age and the settled civilisations to the south, he discerned that "for many thousands of years there has been an almost rhythmic recurrence of conquest of the civilizations by the nomads." According to Wells, this dialectical antagonism reflected not only a struggle for power and resources, but a conflict of values:  "Civilization, as this outline has shown, arose as a community of obedience, and was essentially a community of obedience.  But . . . [t]here was a continual influx of masterful will from the forests, parklands, and steppes. The human spirit had at last rebelled altogether against the blind obedience of the common life; it was seeking . . . to achieve a new and better sort of civilization that should also be a community of will." Wells regarded the democratic movements of modernity as an aspect of this movement.

Development of free intelligence 
Wells saw in the bards who were, he believed, common to all the "Aryan-speaking peoples" an important "consequence of and a further factor in [the] development of spoken language which was the chief factor of all the human advances made in Neolithic times. . . . they mark a new step forward in the power and range of the human mind," extending the temporal horizons of the human imagination. He saw in the ancient Greeks another definitive advance of these capacities, "the beginnings of what is becoming at last nowadays a dominant power in human affairs, the 'free intelligence of mankind'." The first individual he distinguishes as embodying free intelligence is the Greek historian Herodotus. The Hebrew prophets and the tradition they founded he calls "a parallel development of the free conscience of mankind." Much later, he singles out Roger Bacon as a precursor of "a great movement in Europe . . . toward reality" that contributed to the development of "intelligence". But "[i]t was only in the eighties of the nineteenth century that this body of inquiry began to yield results to impress the vulgar mind. Then suddenly came electric light and electric traction, and the transmutation of forces, the possibility of sending power . . . began to come through to the ideas of ordinary people."

Rejection of racial or cultural superiority 
Although a few passages in The Outline of History reflect racialist thinking, Wells firmly rejected all theories of racial and civilizational superiority.  On the subject of race, Wells writes that "Mankind from the point of view of a biologist is an animal species in a state of arrested differentiation and possible admixture . . . [A]ll races are more or less mixed.". As for the claim that Western minds are superior, he states that upon examination "this generalization . . . dissolves into thin air."

Omitted aspects of world history 
A number of themes are downplayed in The Outline of History:  Ancient Greek philosophy and Roman law figure among these. Others are altogether absent, in spite of Wells's own intellectual attachment to some of them:  romanticism, the concept of the Age of Enlightenment and feminism, for example.

Composition of the work

Wells's methodology 
In the years leading up to the writing of The Outline of History Wells was increasingly preoccupied by history, as many works testify. (See, for example, The New Machiavelli, Marriage, An Englishman Looks at the World, The Wife of Sir Isaac Harman, Mr. Britling Sees It Through, etc.) During World War I, he tried to promote a world history to be sponsored by the League of Nations Union, of which he was a member. But no professional historian would commit to undertake it, and Wells, in a financially sound position thanks to the success of Mr. Britling Sees It Through and believing that his work would earn little, resolved to devote a year to the project. His wife Catherine (Jane) agreed to be his collaborator in typing, research, organisation, correspondence, and criticism. Wells relied heavily on the Encyclopædia Britannica (11th ed., 1911), and standard secondary texts. He made use of the London Library, and enlisted as critical readers "a team of advisers for comment and correction, chief among them Ernest Barker, Harry Johnston, E. Ray Lankester, and Gilbert Murray. The sections were then rewritten and circulated for further discussion until Wells judged that they had reached a satisfactory standard." The bulk of the work was written between October 1918 and November 1919.

Unproven allegations of plagiarism 

In 1927 a Canadian, Florence Deeks, sued Wells for infringement of copyright and breach of trust. She claimed that he had stolen much of the content of The Outline of History from a work, The Web of the World's Romance, which she had submitted to the Canadian publisher Macmillan Canada, who held onto the manuscript for nearly nine months before rejecting it. The Ontario trial court found the evidence inadequate and dismissed the case. An appeal to the Ontario Appellate Division was dismissed, as was a final appeal to the Judicial Committee of the Privy Council, at that time the highest court of appeal for the British Empire.

This book examines the case Deeks had against Wells, for misappropriating information from her manuscript "The Web of the World's Romance", which she had entrusted to MacMillan Canada. The records are unclear at points as to who handled it, and McKillop states that when she finally had the rejected manuscript back months later, she left it unopened for almost a year. In the meantime "Outline of History" came out, she bought a copy, and became suspicious that Wells had copied from her manuscript.

McKillop's story is mostly circumstantial, due to lack of hard facts in some areas, but the original material from MacMillan's records and Deeks were available for inspection and scrutiny. He paints a portrait of a woman pursuing her right for acknowledgement, and let down by a legal system that heavily favoured men at that time, both in Canada and in the UK. Deeks's three expert witnesses testified that there could be no doubt Wells had copied from her manuscript, which was returned to her well thumbed and worn with stains, as though someone had been perusing it for months.

Deeks's original premise had been to produce a history of important women in history and their accomplishments. Later she modified it to be more a world history but with heavy accent on what we would now describe as feminism. Wells appeared to her to have used much of her work, having stripped the feminism from it. Some mistakes Deeks made in her manuscript were also seen in Wells's book, and it was considered by her expert witnesses that in the time Wells wrote his "Outline", he could not have possibly done all the research, suggesting that a large part was copied from Deeks's work.

In 2004 Denis N. Magnusson, Professor Emeritus in the Faculty of Law, Queen's University, Kingston, Ontario, published an article on Deeks v. Wells in the Queen's Law Journal. In it he re-examines the case in relation to McKillop's book (described as a "novel" in the editorial introduction). While having some sympathy for Deeks, he "challenges the outpouring of public support" for her. He argues that she had a weak case that was not well presented, and though she may have met with sexism from her lawyers, she did receive a fair trial. He goes on to say that the law applied is essentially the same law that would be applied to a similar case today (i.e. 2004).

Reception 
The Outline of History has inspired responses from the serious to the parodic.

 In 1921 Algonquin Round Table member Donald Ogden Stewart achieved his first success with a satire entitled A Parody Outline of History.
 The Outline of History was praised on publication by E. M. Forster and Beatrice Webb.
Edward Shanks described The Outline as "a wonderful book". However, he also criticised what he saw as Wells's "impatience" and stated "it is an unfortunate fact that Mr. Wells often seems to find himself in the position of scold to the entire human race".
 American historians James Harvey Robinson and Carl Becker lauded the Outline and hailed Wells as "a formidable ally".
 In 1925 G. K. Chesterton, wrote The Everlasting Man, a critique of The Outline of History from a Catholic perspective.<ref>Dale, Alzina Stone, The Outline of Sanity : A Biography of G.K. Chesterton
Grand Rapids, Mich. : Eerdmans, 1982.  (p. 248)</ref> 
 In 1926 Hilaire Belloc wrote "A Companion to Mr. Wells's Outline of History". A devout Catholic, Belloc was deeply offended by Wells's treatment of Christianity in The Outline of History. Wells wrote a short book in rebuttal called Mr. Belloc Objects to "The Outline of History".  In 1926, Belloc published his reply, Mr. Belloc Still Objects.
 In 1934 Arnold J. Toynbee dismissed the criticism of The Outline of History and praised Wells's work in his A Study of History: Mr. H. G. Wells's The Outline of History was received with unmistakable hostility by a number of historical specialists. . . . They seemed not to realize that, in re-living the entire life of Mankind as a single imaginative experience, Mr. Wells was achieving something which they themselves would hardly have dared to attempt ... In fact, the purpose and value of Mr. Wells's book seem to have been better appreciated by the general public than by the professional historians of the day. Toynbee went on to refer to The Outline several times in A Study of History, offering his share of criticism but maintaining a generally positive view of the book.
Also in 1934 Jawaharlal Nehru stated that The Outline of History was a major influence on his own work, Glimpses of World History.
 After Wells's death The Outline was still the object of admiration from historians A. J. P. Taylor (who called it "the best" general survey of history) and Norman Stone, who praised Wells for largely avoiding the Eurocentric and racist attitudes of his time.
 In his autobiography Christopher Isherwood recalled that when he and W. H. Auden encountered Napoleon's tomb on a 1922 school trip to France, their first reaction was to quote The Outline's negative assessment of the French ruler.
Malham Wakin, head of the philosophy department at the United States Air Force Academy, encouraged his students to consider and challenge a statement made by Wells in The Outline of History: "The professional military mind is by necessity an inferior and unimaginative mind; no man of high intellectual quality would willingly imprison his gifts in such a calling."

CensorshipThe Outline of History was one of the first of Wells' books to be banned in Nazi Germany.

 In popular culture 
 In Dashiell Hammett's 1930 book The Maltese Falcon Casper Gutman says, "These are facts, historical facts, not schoolbook history, not Mr. Wells's history, but history nevertheless."
 In Virginia Woolf's posthumously published 1941 novel Between the Acts the character Lucy Swithin reads a book entitled The Outline of History.  
 In John Huston's 1941 film The Maltese Falcon Kasper Gutman played by Sydney Greenstreet says "These are facts, historical facts, not schoolbook history, not Mr. Wells's history, but history nevertheless."
 In Fredric Brown's 1949 science-fiction novel What Mad Universe the protagonist finds himself transported to an alternate universe. Finding a copy of Wells's Outline of History, it turns out to be identical to the one he knows until 1903, at which point the alternate Wells records the invention of anti-gravity, a fast human expansion into space, a brutal war for the conquest of Mars which Wells strongly denounces, followed by a titanic conflict with Arcturus.
 In Satyajit Ray's 1959 film Apur Sansar the book, wrapped in a white cloth cover with only the title visible, is seen on the bookshelf of the protagonist Apurba Roy.
 In John Updike's 1961 story "Pigeon Feathers" the young protagonist finds a copy of Outline of History and is surprised and disturbed by Wells's descriptions of Jesus. Updike describes Wells's account of Jesus as:
He had been an obscure political agitator, a kind of hobo, in a minor colony of the Roman Empire. By an accident impossible to reconstruct, he (the small h horrified David) survived his own crucifixion and presumably died a few weeks later. A religion was founded on the freakish incident. The credulous imagination of the times retrospectively assigned miracles and supernatural pretensions to Jesus; a myth grew, and then a church, whose theology at most points was in direct contradiction of the simple, rather communistic teachings of the Galilean.
 William Golding used Wells's description of the Neanderthals as a basis in creating his own Neanderthal tribe in his 1955 novel, The Inheritors.

 See also 
 Guns, Germs, and Steel (Jared Diamond)

 Notes and references 

Further reading
 Dawson, Christopher. "H. G. Wells and the Outline of History" History Today (Oct 1951) 1#10 pp 28–32

 External links 

Full text of the 1920 edition of The Outline of History
PDF versions of the 1971 edition of the text: Volume One, Volume Two via Internet Archive
The Outline of History at Project Gutenberg
Salon.com's review of A. B. McKillop's examination of the Deeks/Wells plagiarism case, The Spinster and the Prophet''.
A Short History Of The World, the full text of Wells's much shorter history, published in 1922.

1920 non-fiction books
History books about civilization
Books by H. G. Wells
Universal history books
Censored books
Cultural depictions of Ashoka